The League of Washington Theatres (LOWT) is an association of non-profit professional theaters and theater-related organizations in and around the Washington, DC area.  Its programs include an annual area-wide audition, Free Night of Theater, and Stages For All Ages. LOWT President David Andrew Snider, Producing Artistic Director and CEO of Young Playwrights' Theater, was elected in 2007.

It won the Helen Hayes Award Washington Post Award for "Stages for All Ages" in 1999.

Members
Actors' Center
Adventure Theatre
African Continuum Theatre Company
American Century Theater
Arena Stage 
Asian Stories in America (ASIA) 
Bay Theater Company
Catalyst Theater Company
Charter Theatre
Cultural Alliance of Greater Washington 
Discovery Theater 
Folger Theatre 
Ford's Theatre Society
Forum Theatre 
Fountainhead Theatre
GALA Hispanic Theatre 
Horizons Theatre 
The In Series
John F. Kennedy Center for the Performing Arts
Journeymen Theater Ensemble
The Keegan Theatre 
MetroStage 
National Conservatory of Dramatic Arts
National Theatre 
Olney Theatre Center for the Arts 
Playwrights' Forum 
Quotidian Theatre Company
Rep Stage 
Rorschach Theatre
Round House Theatre 
Scena Theatre 
Shakespeare Theatre Company 
Signature Theatre
Synetic Theater  
Smallbeer Theatre Company 
Solas Nua
Studio Theatre
Teatro de la Luna 
Theater Alliance 
Theater J 
Theater of the First Amendment 
The Theatre Lab 
Washington Area Archive of the Performing Arts (WAPAVA) 
Washington Improv Theater
Washington Savoyards
Washington Stage Guild 
WSC Avant Bard (formerly Washington Shakespeare Company)
Woolly Mammoth Theatre Company
Young Playwrights' Theater

See also
List of LORT Member Theatres
Theater in Washington D.C.

References

External links
Official website

 
Members of the Cultural Alliance of Greater Washington
Theatre in Washington, D.C.
Theatrical organizations in the United States